Newville is a town in Henry County, Alabama, United States. It is part of the Dothan, Alabama Metropolitan Statistical Area. At the 2020 census, the population was 544.

History
James Madison Wells founded a village called "Wells" c. 1882. When the Abbeville Southern Railroad laid tracks through the town in 1893, its name was changed to "Wells Station". The post office was built in 1894. Wells Station incorporated as "Newville" in 1903.

The town of Newville became prosperous with merchants, banks, lodges, doctors, churches, Newville High School, Rosenwald High School, societies, a newspaper, a depot, sawmills, cotton gins, mule stables and all the elements required by a developing town. Newville's slow decline commenced after the Great Depression due to farm mechanization and loss of commerce.

Newville Baptist Church Cemetery
James M. and Catherine Wells donated one-half acre of land in 1887 for the site of the church and cemetery. The oldest known grave is that of William Y. Kirkland who died April 10, 1891. The church paid W.M. Harris fifty dollars in 1901 for two and one-half acres of land for the cemetery. In 1947, burial spaces were sold for 25 center per square foot. Nancy Price gave the church one acre of land for the cemetery in 1958. There are over 700 marked and unmarked graves. The Newville Cemetery was listed on the Alabama Historic Cemetery Register in 2005.

Newville High School
The first known school in Newville was at Center Church in 1881. When Grange Hall was built in 1891, church service and school were held on the first floor. In 1913, Grange Hall was torn down and the wood was used to build a school. Newville Public School became Newville Junior High in 1920. In 1923, it was decided to build a modern brick school. Newville High School was opened in 1929. The school building at Concord was moved to Newville in 1935. In 1936, the school building burned. A new structure was built with five rooms and a large auditorium. In 1938, the Works Progress Administration built the vocational building. When bathrooms were added in 1944, Newville School became one of the most modern buildings in Henry County. The Newville High School band was organized in 1961. In 1968, Newville High School closed.

Newville Rosenwald School
In 1894, the first known black school in Newville was organized and a building was built. The Jacksonian Enterprise School opened in May 1894. Parents and patrons financially supported this school. The school library contained more books than any school in this part of the country. The school grounds included Store's Grove, a circular grove of 104 oak trees with a 30-foot avenue running through the middle of it. Each tree was named in honor of a patron. In 1919, the Newville Community requested assistance for the school. They received it from the Rosenwald Foundation. A new school was built and named "Newville Rosenwald School". The Henry County Board of Education began to contribute to the finances of Newville Rosenwald School about 1922. During the late 1940s, Newville Rosenwald School became a high school. It was about this time that the original school burned down and a new building was constructed. In 1968 Rosenwald High School was closed.

Geography
Newville is located in southwestern Henry County at  (31.421841, -85.336434). Alabama State Route 173 passes through the center of town as Broad Street, leading north  to Abbeville and south  to Headland. U.S. Route 431, a four-lane highway, cuts through the southeast corner of Newville, also connecting Newville and Headland.

Demographics

As of the census of 2000, there were 553 people, 221 households, and 163 families residing in the town. The racial makeup of the town was 52.80% White, 44.30% Black or African American, 2.71% from other races, and 0.18% from two or more races. 2.35% of the population were Hispanic or Latino of any race.

There were 221 households, out of which 32.6% had children under the age of 18 living with them, 52.0% were married couples living together, 17.2% had a female householder with no husband present, and 26.2% were non-families. 23.1% of all households were made up of individuals, and 11.8% had someone living alone who was 65 years of age or older. The average household size was 2.50 and the average family size was 2.93.

In the town, the population was spread out, with 27.1% under the age of 18, 5.8% from 18 to 24, 27.8% from 25 to 44, 21.5% from 45 to 64, and 17.7% who were 65 years of age or older. The median age was 37 years. For every 100 females, there were 86.2 males. For every 100 females age 18 and over, there were 84.9 males.

The median income for a household in the town was $27,596, and the median income for a family was $31,375. Males had a median income of $25,714 versus $21,250 for females. The per capita income for the town was $13,890. About 8.9% of families and 14.9% of the population were below the poverty line, including 16.4% of those under age 18 and 20.2% of those age 65 or over.

A note of business:
Three businesses in the town of Newville are: (a)a liquor store called "Fermentations package store", (b) a realtor named "Brackin Realty", and (c) a sawmill that goes by the name of "Abby Creek Supply". 
There are only two businesses in the entire town of Newville now. Those businesses are a run-down sawmill named, "Abby Creek Supply" and "Brackin Realty".

Notable people
 Monica Cox, Professor and Department Chair, Ohio State University
 Willie Tullis, former NFL defensive back
 Frederick Palmer Whiddon, founder and long-time president of the University of South Alabama

See also

 List of towns in Alabama

References

External links

Towns in Henry County, Alabama
Towns in Alabama
Dothan metropolitan area, Alabama